West District is a district of Taichung, Taiwan. It is the second smallest district in Taichung City after Central District. Former Taichung City Hall and part of Taichung City Government offices are located in this district.

History
The district used to be part of Taichung provincial city before the merger with Taichung County to form Taichung special municipality on 25 December 2010.

Division
The West District of Taichung is divided into 25 Li (里):

Education
 National Taichung University of Education

Tourism

Historic sites
 Shenji New Village
 Taichung Shiyakusho
 Taichung Prefectural Hall
 Taichung City Hall
 Datun Region Hall
 Taichung Takenori Hall
 National Taichung University of Education Administrative Building
 Datung Elementary School Administrative Building
 Sun Li-jen Former Residence
 Lin Chih-Chu Studio

Museums and arts
 National Museum of Natural Science
 National Taiwan Museum of Fine Arts
 Taichung City Dadun Cultural Center
 Taichung Literature Museum
 Taichung Municipal Cultural Center (台中市立文化中心)
 Tea Street (精明一街)
 Dalu Road Commercial District
 Calligraphy Greenway

See also
 Taichung

References

External links

  

Districts of Taichung